Midnight Patrol: Adventures in the Dream Zone  is an animated series produced by Hanna-Barbera in conjunction with Sleepy Kids PLC and is known outside the US as Potsworth & Co. In the United Kingdom, the BBC felt that the suggestion of children being awake after midnight was inappropriate (which is reflected in the theme song's lyrics in the British broadcast); thus the name was changed.

The show is about four children who meet in their dreams every night, accompanied by their dog Potsworth and a toy dinosaur, to protect the sleep of the innocent from the dreaded Nightmare Prince.

History
The series revolves around Potsworth, an English Springer Spaniel, based upon a real-life springer spaniel called Potsworth, bought from the Battersea Dogs Home by Martin and Vivien Schrager-Powell. The couple were somewhat disheartened with some of the children's programmes being made at the time, commenting that "Six-year-olds just aren't content to be fobbed off with 'Mr Wizard go pouf and nasty man go away'. Stories these days have to be believable, contain some logical process". In 1987, Martin started writing stories about Potsworth who lives in a city in America and four young children: Carter, Keiko, Rosie, and Nick.  The couple took the idea to Hanna-Barbera and suggested a 50-50 deal to turn the stories into a television series.

First appearing on The Funtastic World of Hanna-Barbera on 1 September 1990, Midnight Patrol: Adventures in the Dream Zone lasted only 13 episodes.  It was watched by 8.5 million in the US while 5.1 million watched the series on Children's BBC in Britain, making it the "second most popular children's show on British television after Neighbours".

The "real" Potsworth became something of a celebrity when he featured extensively in the British media as part of the promotion campaign for the cartoon series when it first aired in the UK in 1990/91 television season.   A comic adaptation of Potsworth & Co. was featured in the merged Beezer and Topper from issue #87 to #153 (May 16, 1992—August 21, 1993) and, when that comic closed, The Dandy from issue #2701 onwards (August 28, 1993—1994).

The series' setting, "Dream Zone", was first used on  "Back to Next Saturday", the NBC Saturday Morning preview special for the 1985 season.

Premise
The series tells of four children and Potsworth the dog who live in the same neighborhood. When they go to sleep at night they turn up in the Dream Zone where, as the Midnight Patrol, they are appointed by the Grand Dozer to protect it from nightmares and other threats and are given their missions by the Snooze Patrol. Their main enemy is the Nightmare Prince.

Whilst they are in the Dream Zone, the five have special powers. Keiko has a flying skateboard; Carter can draw anything and then have it come to life; Nick is super-strong and is able to fly; his stuffed toy Murphy comes to life; whilst his cynical sister Rosie tags along. Potsworth himself acquires the power of speech which enables him to complain about the way he is treated in the real world, and make wry comments about the kids and their own attitudes and relationships. The cartoon Potsworth had a very "English" accent, even in the American version of the programmes, reflecting his real-life counterpart's British origins.

Computer game
An officially licensed computer game of the series, using its British title of Potsworth and Co, was released in 1992 by Hi-Tec Software for the ZX Spectrum, Amstrad CPC, Commodore 64 and Atari ST.

In this scrolling platform game, the player took on the role of one of the characters in each themed level and had to collect various items and then reach the exit.

Characters

Midnight Patrol
The 5 Midnight Patrol members are the main stars of the show. Each one has his/her individual abilities.

 Potsworth - A sarcastic 10-year-old English Springer Spaniel who is the leader and has the ability to talk when he enters the Dream Zone.
 Carter - Potsworth's owner. A 10-year-old African American boy who is an expert artist. In the Dream Zone, his magic paintbrush can bring many things to life.
 Keiko - A 9-year-old Asian American girl who rides a flying skateboard in the Dream Zone. She is energetic and very optimistic and likes to be seen as the leader of the group.
 Rosie - An 8-year-old girl. A rude, annoying brat who gives the group a very hard time (in ways similar to Lucy van Pelt in the Peanuts comics by Charles M. Schulz, Margaret Wade in the Dennis the Menace comics by Hank Ketcham, Zoe in H-B's Fantastic Max cartoon series, Pre-teen Daphne Blake in H-B's A Pup Named Scooby-Doo or Angelica Pickles in Nickelodeon's Rugrats cartoon series), though she still helps out in dangerous situations. She calls her brother Nick by his full name "Nicholas" whenever she yells at him, which is quite often. She is the only member of the Midnight Patrol without a special ability.
 Nick -  Rosie's 6-year-old brother who is a flying superhero when he's in the Dream Zone and is sometimes referred to as "Super Nick".
 Murphy - Nick's toy Brontosaurus who comes to life when he enters the Dream Zone.

Other Dream Zone characters
The Dream Zone has a number of inhabitants, the principals of which include:

 The Grand Dozer - The King of the Dream Zone. He spends his time half-asleep on top of a pile of mattresses. He has to stay this way because if he were to be fully awake the Dream Zone will come to an end. The Grand Dozer gives advice, but in the form of riddles which can be a bit of a frustration.
 The Chief - A large but friendly woman who heads the local police department and assigns the Midnight Patrol with their missions.
 Sebastian - The Grand Dozer's head butler. He is always anxious that his King is safe and asleep. A running gag of the series is that, whenever Sebastian claims the Grand Dozer is in a certain mood, the Grand Dozer would be shown sleeping, prompting Sebastian to state the Grand Dozer would be in that mood if he were awake.
 The Greystone Giant - A giant made of rock who lives in a cave filled with various objects which he supplies for people's dreams. Because there are so many dreamers he is always at work and never stops grumbling about it. Though deep down, he loves his job.
 The Nosey Bird - A talking bird who enjoys spreading gossip. He talks creepy like Peter Lorre and appears in the episodes "The Nightmirror" and "Santa-Napped".

Antagonists
 The Nightmare Prince - The main villain of the series. The Nightmare Prince is always coming up with ways of disrupting the Grand Dozer's sleep or other nasty schemes in order to allow nightmares to take over the dreams. He is the Midnight Patrol's main enemy, though he is such a bungling idiot that his plans can fail due to his own incompetence.
 Igor - One of the Nightmare Prince's dimwitted potato-shaped minions.
 Irving - One of the Nightmare Prince's dimwitted potato-shaped minions.
 Shorty - One of the Nightmare Prince's dimwitted potato-shaped minions.
 The Nightmare Prince's Mother - This unseen character is always phoning up to tell her son to get on with destroying happy dreams and reproving him when things go wrong. The fact that the Prince has a large-sized telephone (as opposed to a mobile phone) literally up his sleeve means that she calls him almost all the time. Her constant yapping through the phone is reminiscent of the General from Dastardly and Muttley in Their Flying Machines.
 The Cat - A giant cat who enjoys bullying and terrorizing the dogs in Dogland. He only appears in King Potsworth.
 Count Bubba Bonebreaker - The nephew of the Nightmare Prince's Mother and the cousin of the Nightmare Prince. This villain was once in charge of nightmares when the Nightmare Prince's Mother demoted the Nightmare Prince to janitor. The Midnight Patrol helped to get the Nightmare Prince back to his position by thwarting Bubba. He only appears in "When Bubba Rules".

Episodes

Cast
 Charles Adler as Rocky (in "I Was a Teenage Babysitter")
 Christine Avila
 Michael Bell as Sebastian
 Hamilton Camp as The Grand Dozer
 Brian Cummings
 Jim Cummings as Giant Cat (in "King Potsworth"), Rags (in "King Potsworth")
 Judyann Elder
 Patrick Fraley as Jester Dog (in "King Potsworth")
 Dick Gautier
 Joan Gerber as Nightmare Prince's Mother
 Dorian Harewood
 Elisabeth Harnois as Rosie
 Whitby Hertford as Nick
 Janice Kawaye as Keiko
 Emily Kuroda
 George Lemore as Carter
 David Lander
 Marilyn Lightstone
 Allan Lurie
 Kenneth Mars as Greystone Giant
 Scott Menville as Wonder Kid (in "Nick's Super Switch")
 Brian Mitchell
 Howie Morris as Dr. Akenhoffer (in "Rosie's Fuss Attack")
 Ron Palillo
 Rob Paulsen as Nightmare Prince
 Henry Polic II
 Clive Revill as Potsworth
 Ronnie Schell
 Tom Scott
 Hal Smith as Santa Claus (in "Santa-Napped")
 B.J. Ward
 Frank Welker as Murphy, Nosey Bird (in "The Nightmirror," "Santa-Napped")
 Anderson Wong

Ratings (CBBC Channel)
Monday 6 May 2002- 20,000 (9th most watched on CBBC that week)

Home media
In 1991, Hanna-Barbera Home Video released a single VHS cassette of the series in the United States entitled Potsworth and the Midnight Patrol containing four episodes which are "Save the Cave", "The Wishing Whale", "King Potsworth", and "The Nightmirror".

References

External links
 
 Potsworth & Co. @ classic media
 A Potsworth & Co Website
 Toonrific

1990s American animated television series
1990s British animated television series
1990s British children's television series
1990 American television series debuts
1990 American television series endings
1990 British television series debuts
1990 British television series endings
American children's animated action television series
American children's animated adventure television series
American children's animated comedy television series
American children's animated fantasy television series
British children's animated action television series
British children's animated adventure television series
British children's animated comedy television series
British children's animated fantasy television series
English-language television shows
BBC children's television shows
First-run syndicated television programs in the United States
Television series by Hanna-Barbera
The Funtastic World of Hanna-Barbera
Television series by Universal Television
DreamWorks Classics
Dandy strips
Animated television series about dogs
Television shows about dreams
Television shows about nightmares
Television characters introduced in 1990